
Węgrów County is a unit of territorial administration and local government (powiat) in Masovian Voivodeship, east-central Poland. It came into being on January 1, 1999, as a result of the Polish local government reforms passed in 1998.

As of 2019 its total population is 66,037, out of which the population of Węgrów is 12,628, that of Łochów is 6,825, and the rural population is 46,584.

Neighbouring counties
Węgrów County is bordered by Ostrów Mazowiecka County to the north, Sokołów County to the east, Siedlce County to the south, Mińsk County to the south-west, and Wołomin County and Wyszków County to the west.

Administrative division
The county is subdivided into nine gminas (one urban, one urban-rural and seven rural). These are listed in the following table, in descending order of population.

References

 
Land counties of Masovian Voivodeship